Cymindis kricheldorffi is a species of ground beetle in the subfamily Harpalinae. It was described by Fuente in 1921.

References

kricheldorffi
Beetles described in 1921